Boccolini is a surname. Notable people with the surname include:

 Alfredo Boccolini (1885–1956), Italian actor
 Alessandro Boccolini (born 1984), Italian football (soccer) goalkeeper
 Laurence Boccolini (born 1963), French radio and television host

See also
 Broccolini (surname)